"Stock Exchange" is the third single from the duo Miss Kittin & The Hacker's debut album First Album.

Writing and inspiration
Lyrically, "Stock Exchange" deals with the life of a high end Wall Street businesslady.  The lyrics support this, including how the men "touch her bum in the lift of the Empire State [building]".  And also the lyrics, "Is it real this pink punk costume I wear?
All the time to seduce Japanese 'hommes d'affaire' [English:businessmen]."  She also has suicidal ideations as she sings that she is "dreaming of a hot bath, cutting my veins."

Composition
"Stock Exchange" is credited as an electroclash song with disco and rave influences.

Critical reception
Mark Beaumont of NME said that Miss Kittin "monotones like a German robot Cheeky Girl over some nifty "Vice City" disco, prompting a moral debate on whether its possible to sexually  a lift tannoy system."

Cultural impact
"Stock Exchange" appeared on the mix albums Fuck Me I'm Famous by David Guetta, and FabricLive.33 by Spank Rock.

Music video
The music video for "Stock Exchange" was directed by Régis Brochier of 7th Floor Productions.

Live performances
Miss Kittin performed "Stock Exchange" live at the Sónar festival and included it on her album Live at Sónar.

Track listing
 "Stock Exchange (Original)" – 
 "Stock Exchange (Adam Sky Remix)" –

Charts

References

2003 singles
Miss Kittin songs
Songs about New York City
Electroclash songs
Songs written by Miss Kittin
2001 songs
Songs written by The Hacker